Christmas Creek Airport  is an airport serving Christmas Creek Station, in the Australian state of Western Australia.

It is located in the Shire of Derby–West Kimberley, one of the four local government areas in the Kimberley region of northern Western Australia.

Facilities

See also
 List of airports in Western Australia
 Aviation transport in Australia

References

External links
Airservices Aerodromes & Procedure Charts

Airports in Western Australia
Kimberley (Western Australia)